Akiko Kawase may refer to:

 Akiko Kawase (actress) (born 1980), Japanese voice actor
 Akiko Kawase (synchronised swimmer) (born 1971), Japanese former synchronized swimmer